Amruthalur is a village in Guntur district of the Indian state of Andhra Pradesh. It is the headquarters of Amruthaluru mandal in Tenali revenue division. The village forms a part of Andhra Pradesh Capital Region and is under the jurisdiction of APCRDA.

Geography 

Government and politics 
Earlier Amruthalur used to be an assembly constituency and Saranu Ramaswamy chowdary was elected member of legislative assembly 

Amruthalur Gram Panchayat is the local self-government of the village. There are 14 wards, each represented by an elected ward member. The present sarpanch is vacant, elected by the ward members. The village is administered by the  Amruthalur Mandal Parishad at the intermediate level of panchayat raj institutions.

Education 

As per the school information report for the academic year 2018–19, the village has a total of 9 schools. These include one private and 8 Zilla/Mandal Parishad.

See also 
List of villages in Guntur district

References 

Villages in Guntur district
Mandal headquarters in Guntur district